Air Headquarters (AHQ) is the Headquarters of Pakistan Air Force, located in Islamabad. Initially it was established at Peshawar on 15 August 1947. Later it was moved to Karachi on 1 June 1948 and back to Peshawar in 1960. In 1983 construction of Air headquarters was started at Islamabad after it was decided to have all the armed forces headquarters in the capital city. On 1 August 2005 the headquarters was moved from Chaklala, Rawalpindi to Islamabad. During the construction of the headquarters building at Islamabad the headquarters offices were housed at PAF base Chaklala.

See also
 Joint Staff Headquarters (Pakistan)
 General Headquarters (Pakistan Army)
 Naval Headquarters (Pakistan Navy)

References 

Pakistan Air Force
Islamabad
Military headquarters in Pakistan
Pakistan